Alfredo Sánchez may refer to:
Alfredo Sánchez (footballer, born 1904), Mexican footballer
Alfredo Sánchez Monteseirín (born 1957), Spanish politician
Alfredo Sánchez (Spanish footballer) (born 1972), Spanish footballer
Alfredo Sánchez (footballer, born 1987), Mexican footballer